The 11th Arabian Gulf Cup was held in Qatar, in November 1992.

The tournament was won by Qatar for the first time.

Iraq were excluded from the tournament because of the invasion of Kuwait.

Tournament

The teams played a single round-robin style competition. The team achieving first place in the overall standings was the tournament winner.

Result

References

1992
1992 in Asian football
1992
1992–93 in Qatari football
1992–93 in Bahraini football
1992–93 in Saudi Arabian football
1992–93 in Emirati football
1992–93 in Kuwaiti football
1992–93 in Omani football